The Laevi, or Levi (who are not to be confused with descendants of Levi), were a Ligurian people in Gallia Transpadana, on the river Ticinus, who, in conjunction with the Marici, built the town of Ticinum (the modern Pavia).

They joined Bellovesus' migrations towards Italy, together with the Aeduii, Bituriges, Ambarri, Arverni, Aulerci, Carnutes and Senones.

References

 Harry Thurston Peck, Harpers Dictionary of Classical Antiquities (1898). Article available online here.

Gauls
Ligures
Historical Celtic peoples